Peridinium is a genus of motile, marine and freshwater dinoflagellates. Their morphology is considered typical of the armoured dinoflagellates, and their form is commonly used in diagrams of a dinoflagellate's structure. Peridinium can range from 30 to 70 μm in diameter, and has very thick thecal plates.

Morphology
Peridinium is enclosed by cellulose theca and with two flagellates. The composition of the theca is laminaribiose and laminaritriose linking by β – 1, 4 and β – 1, 3 linkages. The cell body of Peridinium is highly polarized and is distinguishable from apical and antapical sides or dorsal and ventral sides. Their theca is divided into epicone and hypocone by the middle region (also called girdle or cingulum). The flagellates have two different directions, one is surrounding the middle region while the other are in the longitudinal groove of hypocone. 
The chloroplast in Peridinium is triple membrane, and some plastid-derived organelles like pyrenoid or eyespot also. This provides the evidence that these organelles originated from secondary endosymbiosis. The inner membrane of mitochondrion is tubular. Trichocyst is a specialized organelle in dinoflagellate which help them defense to predators.

Life cycle
Peridinium is a haplontic algae. Most time of Peridinium are haploid vegetative cells and undergoing asexual or sexual cycle. They only form zygote before dormancy.

In asexual cycle, the haploid vegetative cell throws the theca before mitosis and produces two daughter cells by mitosis. During mitosis, the chromosome in their nucleus condenses but the nucleus of endosymbiont doesn’t. After the cleavage furrow starts to separate their nucleus, the nucleus of endosymbiont then passes through the gaps between cleavage furrow and their nucleus. Then the nucleus of endosymbiont was divided by cleavage furrow together.  

In sexual cycle, they produce gametes as isogamete and the gametes fuse to form planozygotes to get dormancy. After dormancy, the zygote starts to undergo meiosis. The first meiosis produces a two diploid nuclei cell without cytokinesis. An asynchronized nucleus division then occurs in one of the two nuclei. One nucleus undergoing second meiosis before cytokinesis in first meiosis and turns into a trinucleate stage. After it, the cytokinesis of first meiosis is completed, and the trinucleate cell is divided into a diploid nucleus cell and a double haploid nuclei cell. When the cytokinesis of second meiosis is completed, finally, it produces four haploid daughter cells.    

Overall, Peridinium dominants in mobile haploid generation. Between spring and summer, the haploid venerative cells produce gametes by mitosis and fuse gametes into a diploid planozygote. The diploid planozygotes then transform into immobile hypnozygotes and deposit to get dormancy in winter. After a year, the hypnozygotes germinate in spring and release haploid vegetative cells.

Ecology
Peridinium gatunense blooms in the Lake Kinneret in Israel which changing the color of the lake is discovered in 1960. The blooming event occurs because the organic mineral is flushed into the sea every year in spring. Organic mineral nourishes the diatom and increases their population. Thus, the planozygotes of Peridinium  break dormancy and release thousands of vegetative cells into the sea by feeding on diatom. From 1960 to 1996, the annual pattern was regularly peaked at spring in each year. But starting from 1996, the blooming was broken. The break of blooming is related to high temperature, other phytoplanktonic competitor (Chytrid or Microcystis), and human activities in the aquatic system by managing the water flow of the river.

Species
Species include:

Peridinium abscissum O.Zacharias
Peridinium achromaticum Levander
Peridinium acutangulum Lemmermann Lemmermann
Peridinium acutum G.Karsten
Peridinium adriaticum H.Broch
Peridinium aequalis W.S.Kent
Peridinium allorgei Lefèvre
Peridinium ampulliforme E.J.F.Wood
Peridinium andrzejowskii Woloszynska
Peridinium annulatum C.A.Kofoid & J.R.Michener
Peridinium anserinum Baumeister
Peridinium aspinum A.F.Meunier
Peridinium assymmetricum L.A.Mangin C.E.H.Ostenfeld
Peridinium asymmetrica T.H.Abé
Peridinium asymmetricum G.Karsten
Peridinium baliense E.R.Lindemann
Peridinium basilium W.S.Drugg
Peridinium belgicum A.Wulff
Peridinium bicorne L.K.Schmarda
Peridinium bidens Lemmermann
Peridinium bimucronatum J.Schiller
Peridinium bipes Stein
Peridinium brasiliense G.Borics & I.Grigorszky
Peridinium callosum E.H.Jörgensen
Peridinium carinatum Ehrenberg
Peridinium caspicum C.E.H.Ostenfeld Lemmermann
Peridinium castaneiforme L.A.Mangin
Peridinium cavispinum L.A.Mangin
Peridinium centenniale Playfair M.Lefèvre
Peridinium chattoni B.Biecheler
Peridinium chattonii Biecheler
Peridinium chilophaenum Ehrenberg
Peridinium chinense J.Schiller
Peridinium cinctum O.F.Müller Ehrenberg - type
Peridinium comatum P.Morgenroth
Peridinium complanatum A.F.Meunier
Peridinium complanatum G.Karsten
Peridinium corniculum Kofoid & Michener
Peridinium crassipyrum Balech
Peridinium cucumis G.H.Wailes
Peridinium cuneatum A.C.J.Goor
Peridinium cypripedium H.J.Clark
Peridinium cystiferum Pavillard
Peridinium dakariensis P.A.Dangeard
Peridinium dalei Indel.& Loeblich Balech
Peridinium deficiens A.F.Meunier
Peridinium delitiense Ehrenberg
Peridinium dentatum V.Hensen
Peridinium diamantum D.M.Churchill & W.A.S.Sarjeant
Peridinium digitale C.-H.-G.Pouchet Lemmermann
Peridinium diplopsalioides A.Henckel
Peridinium disciforme A.Cleve
Peridinium ellipsoideum L.A.Mangin
Peridinium ellipsoideum P.A.Dangeard
Peridinium eocenicum I.C.Cookson & A.Eisenack
Peridinium excavatum G.W.Martin
Peridinium exiguipes L.A.Mangin
Peridinium exiguum P.T.Cleve
Peridinium formosum Pavillard
Peridinium galeatum V.Hensen
Peridinium garderae Balech
Peridinium gargantua Biecheler
Peridinium gatunense Nygaard
Peridinium geminum Playfair
Peridinium gemma A.Cleve
Peridinium globifera T.H.Abé
Peridinium godlewskii Woloszynska
Peridinium goslaviense Wolszynska
Peridinium gracile Gran & Braarud
Peridinium gracile Meunier
Peridinium grani C.E.H.Ostenfeld
Peridinium granisparsum A.F.Meunier
Peridinium granulosum Playfair
Peridinium gravidum A.F.Meunier
Peridinium grenlandicum J.Woloszynska
Peridinium gutwinskii Woloszynska
Peridinium gymnodinium Pénard Entz
Peridinium helix Balech
Peridinium hemisphaericum T.H.Abé
Peridinium herbaceum F.Schütt
Peridinium heteracanthum P.A.Dangeard
Peridinium hirobis T.H.Abé
Peridinium horridissimum V.Hensen
Peridinium horridum V.Hensen
Peridinium huberi J.Schiller
Peridinium hyalinum A.F.Meunier
Peridinium hyalinum C.A.Kofoid & J.R.Michener
Peridinium illustrans O.C.A.Wetzel
Peridinium imperfectum G.A.Klebs
Peridinium inaequale Fauré-Fremiet
Peridinium inaequale N.Peters
Peridinium inclinatum Balech
Peridinium inconspicuum-contactum E.Lindemann F.Ruttner
Peridinium inflatiforme A.Böhm
Peridinium intermedium A.Candeias
Peridinium intermedium Playfair Playfair
Peridinium jensenii Nygaard Nygaard
Peridinium jenzschii Ehrenberg
Peridinium kansanum P.Tasch
Peridinium karianum A.F.Meunier J.Schiller
Peridinium karianum A.Henckel
Peridinium karstenii Kofoid & Michener
Peridinium keyense Nygaard
Peridinium knipowitzschii Ussatschew
Peridinium kofoidii Fauré-Fremiet
Peridinium koma T.H.Abé
Peridinium lambdoideum E.Nagy
Peridinium laticeps J.Gröntved & G.Seidenfaden
Peridinium latipyrum Balech
Peridinium lenticulare E.H.Jörgensen
Peridinium lenticulatum Fauré-Fremiet
Peridinium levanderi T.H.Abé
Peridinium limbatum Stokes Lemmermann
Peridinium lingii Thomasson
Peridinium lithanthracis Ehrenberg Ehrenberg
Peridinium loeblichii E.R.Cox & H.J.Arnott Dale
Peridinium longicollum Pavillard
Peridinium longirostrum A.Cleve
Peridinium longispinum L.A.Mangin
Peridinium lucina Ehrenberg
Peridinium macrapicatum Balech
Peridinium macrospinum L.A.Mangin
Peridinium majus P.A.Dangeard P.A.Dangeard
Peridinium manginii Ostenfeld
Peridinium marinum E.Lindemann
Peridinium matzenaueri K.R.Gaarder
Peridinium melaphyri Jenzsch Ehrenberg
Peridinium meunieri N.Peters
Peridinium micrapium A.F.Meunier
Peridinium minsculum Pavillard
Peridinium minus L.A.Mangin
Peridinium minus O.W.Paulsen O.W.Paulsen
Peridinium minusculum Pavillard
Peridinium minutissimum L.A.Mangin
Peridinium mixtum Woloszynska
Peridinium monacanthum Broch Balech
Peridinium monoceros V.Hensen
Peridinium morzinense Lefèvre
Peridinium multipunctatum Fauré-Fremiet
Peridinium mutsui J.Schiller
Peridinium nanum Balech
Peridinium nasutum L.A.Mangin
Peridinium neglectum V.Hensen)
Peridinium nivale A.F.Meunier J.Schiller
Peridinium nodulosum C.A.Kofoid & J.R.Michener
Peridinium norpacense Balech
Peridinium novum Chodat
Peridinium novum V.Hensen
Peridinium nux J.Schiller
Peridinium oamaruense Deflandre Schiller
Peridinium obesum Matzenauer
Peridinium obliquiforme J.Schiller
Peridinium obliquum L.A.Mangin
Peridinium obliquum P.A.Dangeard
Peridinium obtusipes L.A.Mangin
Peridinium oculatum Dujardin
Peridinium oculatum F.Stein J.Woloszynska
Peridinium okamurae T.H.Abé
Peridinium ovale V.Hensen
Peridinium pacificum Kofoid & Michener
Peridinium paleocenicum I.C.Cookson & A.Eisenack
Peridinium parainerme D.S.Nie & C.C.Wang
Peridinium parallelum Brock
Peridinium parapentagonum Wang
Peridinium parapyriforme J.Hermosilla
Peridinium peisonis J.Schiller
Peridinium perbreve Balech & S.O.Soares
Peridinium perhorridum V.Hensen
Peridinium perminutum A.Cleve
Peridinium perrieri Fauré-Fremiet
Peridinium persicum J.Schiller
Peridinium petersi Balech
Peridinium pietschmanni A.Böhm
Peridinium pilula Ostenfeld Lemmermann
Peridinium planulum J.A.M.Perty
Peridinium playfairi E.Lindemann
Peridinium playfairii E.R.Lindemann
Peridinium pleum P.Tasch
Peridinium polymorphum E.Lindemann
Peridinium ponticum D.Wall & B.Dale
Peridinium porosum V.Hensen
Peridinium pouchetii Kofoid & Michener
Peridinium priscum Ehrenberg
Peridinium privum O.E.Imhof
Peridinium pseudo-intermedium Couté & A.Iltis
Peridinium pseudo-laeve M.Lefèvre
Peridinium pseudoantarcticum Balech
Peridinium pseudograni N.Peters
Peridinium pseudonoctiluca C.-H.-G.Pouchet C.-H.-G.Pouchet
Peridinium pseudopallidum N.Peters
Peridinium pulchellum G.Karsten
Peridinium pulchrum V.Hensen
Peridinium quadricorne A.Henckel
Peridinium quadridentatum F.Stein Gert Hansen
Peridinium raciborskii Woloszynska
Peridinium rampii Balech
Peridinium resistente P.Morgenroth
Peridinium rhombus A.F.Meunier
Peridinium robustum A.F.Meunier
Peridinium rubrum L.S.Cienkowski
Peridinium saecularis G.Murray & F.G.Whitting C.E.H.Ostenfeld
Peridinium scallense E.Lindemann
Peridinium schilleri A.Böhm
Peridinium schuettii Lemmermann G.Karsten
Peridinium seebergi A.Henckel
Peridinium sibiricum A.Henckel
Peridinium simplex Gran & Braarud
Peridinium smirnovii Skvortzov
Peridinium sociale L.-F.Henneguy B.Biecheler
Peridinium solidum A.Cleve
Peridinium speciosum E.H.Jörgensen
Peridinium sphaericum A.F.Meunier
Peridinium sphaericum G.Murray & F.G.Whitting
Peridinium sphaericum K.Okamura
Peridinium spheroidea T.H.Abé
Peridinium spheroides P.A.Dangeard
Peridinium spinosum J.Schiller
Peridinium spirale Gaarder Balech
Peridinium striatum A.Böhm
Peridinium striolatum Playfair
Peridinium subtatranum Woloszynska
Peridinium sydneyense Thomasson
Peridinium symmetricum Halim
Peridinium tabulatum Ehrenberg
Peridinium tassellatum G.Karsten
Peridinium tenuicorne L.A.Mangin
Peridinium tenuissimum C.A.Kofoid
Peridinium tetraceros v. Strampff
Peridinium thuringiae Jenzsch Ehrenberg
Peridinium toali A.Henckel
Peridinium tomnickii J.Woloszynska
Peridinium treubi J.Woloszynska
Peridinium tricuspis O.C.A.Wetzel
Peridinium tridens Ehrenberg
Peridinium triqueta F.Stein Lebour
Peridinium tristylum F.Stein
Peridinium truncatum O.Zacharias
Peridinium truncus T.H.Abé
Peridinium tsingtaoense D.S.Nie & C.C.Wang
Peridinium uberrimum G.J.Allman
Peridinium uliginosum J.Schiller J.Woloszynska
Peridinium umbo L.G.Sjöstedt
Peridinium umbonatum Karsten
Peridinium venter V.Hensen
Peridinium ventricum T.H.Abé
Peridinium ventriosum O.C.A.Wetzel
Peridinium vexans G.Murray & F.G.Whitting
Peridinium volkii Lemmermann
Peridinium volzi Lemmermann
Peridinium volzii Lemmermann
Peridinium volzii Woloszynska
Peridinium vorticella F.Stein
Peridinium wiezejski Woloszynska
Peridinium willei Huitfeldt-Kaas
Peridinium witoslawii E.Lindemann
Peridinium woloszynskae W.Conrad
Peridinium yonedae Abé

References

Dinoflagellate genera
Taxa named by Christian Gottfried Ehrenberg